Hank Smith,  (September 15, 1934 – October 19, 2002) was a Canadian country music singer.

He was born in Garmisch-Partenkirchen, Germany and moved to Canada in 1957. He founded the band Wild Rose Country in 1963 and recorded ten albums. Twelve of Smith's singles made the RPM Country Tracks charts, including five which went to Number One.

Hank Smith was the founding president of the Academy of Country Music Entertainment in 1976, now the Canadian Country Music Association.

Smith was appointed a Member of the Order of Canada in 1994.

Chart singles

References

Members of the Order of Canada
1934 births
2002 deaths
People from Garmisch-Partenkirchen
Canadian country singers
Canadian expatriates in Germany
Musicians from Edmonton
20th-century Canadian male singers